Barton Stacey railway station was a small single platform halt serving an army camp near the village of Barton Stacey. It was opened by February 1940; there was a regular workers' train from Southampton by that date. Little else is known, primarily because of its military association; and its whole life was during wartime — it closed in December 1940

Routes

References

Disused railway stations in Hampshire
Former Great Western Railway stations
Railway stations in Great Britain opened in 1939
Railway stations in Great Britain closed in 1940